is a 2014 Japanese horror mystery suspense film directed by Noboru Iguchi and starring Yuki Yamada which was released on 10 May 2014.

Cast
Yuki Yamada
Ito Ōno
Yūki Morinaga
Mari Iriki
Suzuka Morita
Airi Yamamoto
Asami Sugiura
Kokone Sasaki
Ryūnosuke Kawai
Mitsuki Koga

References

External links
 
Live (Raivu) (2014 film) at IMDB

2010s mystery horror films
2014 horror films
Films directed by Noboru Iguchi
Japanese mystery horror films
2014 films
2010s Japanese films
2010s Japanese-language films